Persatuan Sepakbola Seluruh Situbondo or PSSS is an Indonesian football club based in Situbondo, East Java. They currently compete in the Liga 3 and their homeground is Gelora Mohammad Saleh Stadium.

Coaching Staff

References

External links
 

Football clubs in Indonesia
Football clubs in East Java